Berridge is a surname. Notable people with the surname include:

Bob Berridge (born 1959), British racing driver
Edmund William Berridge (1843–1923), British-born, US-based medical doctor in London, homoeopathist and occultist
Elizabeth Berridge (disambiguation):
Elizabeth Berridge (actress) (born 1962), American actress
Elizabeth Berridge (novelist) (1919–2009), British author
Elizabeth Berridge, Baroness Berridge (born 1972), British politician
Elvin Berridge (born 1989), cricketer from Saint Kitts
Emily Mary Berridge (1872–1947), British palaeobotanist and bacteriologist
Harold Berridge (1872–1949), British civil engineer and mechanical engineer
James Samuel Berridge (1806–1885), British planter, businessman, judge and politician on Saint Kitts
John Berridge (1716−1793), British Anglican evangelical revivalist and hymnist
Kent C. Berridge, American professor of psychology and neuroscience
Louise Berridge, British historical fiction writer
Michael Berridge (1938–2020), British biochemist
Mike Berridge, New Zealand cell biologist
Robert Berridge (born 1984), New Zealand professional light heavyweight boxer
Sheeno Berridge (born 1990), West Indian cricketer
Thomas Berridge (1857–1924), British Liberal politician and solicitor
Virginia Berridge (born 1946), British academic historian and public health expert
William Berridge (cricketer, born 1892), British cricketer
William Berridge (cricketer, born 1894), British cricketer

Surnames of British Isles origin